Ancylocera sallei is a species of beetle in the family Cerambycidae. It was described by Bucquet in 1857.

References

Ancylocera
Beetles described in 1857